Tejaswi Madivada is an Indian actress and model, who works predominantly in the Telugu film industry. A dance tutor turned actress, she made her acting debut in 2013 with Seethamma Vaakitlo Sirimalle Chettu and became noted after starring in Ice Cream. She was a contestant in reality TV show Bigg Boss Telugu 2 in 2018.

Early life and education

Madivada studied at Air Force school Begumpet. She studied Mass communication and Journalism at the St Francis College for Women in Hyderabad. She later worked part-time as a freelance dance instructor with Twist n Turns and took classes for MNCs like HSBC, Wipro, Franklin Templeton and in schools like Nasr School for Girls. She participated at Miss Dabur Gulabari 2011, a beauty pageant, where she was the second runner-up and which reportedly got her first film offer.

Career
Madivada made her acting debut in 2013 with a supporting role in the Telugu family drama film Seethamma Vaakitlo Sirimalle Chettu. Next year she was seen in further supporting roles in Manam and in Nithin's Heart Attack, before landing her first lead role in Ram Gopal Varma's horror film Ice Cream. The film made the headlines after it was reported that Madivada had appeared nude in one scene. Ice Cream received mixed reviews from critics but was a commercial blockbuster.

Her next releases, Lovers, Anukshanam, another Ram Gopal Varma directorial, Kranthi Madhav's Malli Malli Idhi Rani Roju, in which she portrayed Nithya Menen's daughter, Srimanthudu, and Pandaga Chesko saw her playing secondary characters. Her upcoming projects include Omkar's Raju Gari Gadi, Oorvasi Vo Rakshasi Vo, Subramaniam For Sale and her first Tamil film Natpathigaram 79. In 2022 she appeared in a television dance series BB Jodi starring in Star Maa.

Filmography
 All works are in Telugu unless otherwise noted.

Film

Television

References

External links

 

1991 births
Indian film actresses
Actresses in Telugu cinema
Living people
Actresses from Hyderabad, India
21st-century Indian actresses
Female models from Hyderabad, India
Bigg Boss (Telugu TV series) contestants